Matheny is a surname of French origin. Notable people with the surname include:

Bob Matheny (1929–1978), American basketball player
Chad Matheny (born 1979), American singer and songwriter, known professionally as Emperor X
Dmitri Matheny, American jazz flugelhornist
Jason Gaverick Matheny, American academic
Jim Matheny (born 1936), American football player
Judd Matheny (born 1970), American Tennessee State Representative 
Luke Matheny (born 1976), American actor, writer and director
Matt Matheny (born 1970), American college basketball coach
Mike Matheny (born 1970), Major League Baseball manager
Ray Matheny (1925–2020), professor of anthropology at Brigham Young University
Taylor Matheny (born 1979), American retired professional wrestler
William A. Matheny (1902–1973), United States Air Force general

See also 
 Metheny

References